"Women I've Never Had" is a song written and recorded by American musician Hank Williams Jr. It was released in March 1980 as the second single from the album Whiskey Bent and Hell Bound.  The song reached number 5 on the Billboard Hot Country Singles & Tracks chart.

Chart performance

References

1980 singles
Hank Williams Jr. songs
Songs written by Hank Williams Jr.
Song recordings produced by Jimmy Bowen
Elektra Records singles
Curb Records singles
1979 songs